Jimmy Maketta (born 1964/65) is a South African rapist and serial killer who in 2007 pleaded guilty and was convicted on 16 counts of murder and 19 counts of rape. A state psychiatrist described him as a psychopath.

Maketta described how, from April to December 2005, he would attack farm labourers from a hill on Friday evenings near the township of Philippi, Cape Town.

See also
List of serial killers by country
List of serial killers by number of victims

References

1960s births
2005 murders in South Africa
21st-century criminals
Date of birth missing (living people)
Living people
Male serial killers
People convicted of murder by South Africa
People with antisocial personality disorder
Place of birth missing (living people)
Prisoners and detainees of South Africa
South African people convicted of rape
South African people convicted of murder
South African prisoners and detainees
South African rapists
South African serial killers